Boronia hemichiton, commonly known as Mt Arthur boronia is a plant in the citrus family Rutaceae and is endemic to Tasmania. It is an erect, woody shrub with compound leaves and pink or white, four-petalled flowers.

Description

Taxonomy and naming
Boronia hemichiton was first formally described in 2003 by Marco F. Duretto who published the description in  Muelleria from a specimen collected on Mount Arthur. The specific epithet (hemichiton) is derived from the Ancient Greek prefix hemi- meaning "half" and chiton meaning "tunic" or "garment worn next to the skin", referring to the leaves which are only hairy near the base.

Distribution and habitat
The Mt Arthur boronia grows in the wet heath or scrub. It is only known from two subpopulations on Mt Arthur.

Conservation
Boronia hemichiton is listed as "vulnerable" under the Commonwealth Government Environment Protection and Biodiversity Conservation Act 1999 (EPBC) Act and as "endangered" under the Tasmanian Government Threatened Species Protection Act 1995.The main threats to the species are dieback caused by Phytophthora cinnamomi, inappropriate fire regimes and changes in water flow.

References 

hemichiton
Flora of Tasmania
Plants described in 2003
Taxa named by Marco Duretto